Registaniella is a genus of flowering plants belonging to the family Apiaceae.

Its native range is Afghanistan.

Species:
 Registaniella hapaxlegomena Rech.f.

References

Apiaceae
Apiaceae genera